18th Joseph Plateau Awards
May 3, 2005

Best Film: 
 Steve + Sky 
The 18th Joseph Plateau Awards were given on 3 May 2005 and honored the best Belgian filmmaking of 2004.

Winners and nominees

Best Belgian Actor
 Benoît Poelvoorde - Aaltra and Podium
Titus De Voogdt - Steve + Sky
Joan Heldenbergh - Steve + Sky

Best Belgian Actress
 Marie Vinck - The Kiss (De kus)
Viviane de Muynck - Sweet Jam (Confituur)
Yolande Moreau - When the Sea Rises (Quand la mer monte...)

Best Belgian Composer
 Soulwax - Steve + Sky 
Stef Kamil Carlens and Bert Joris - The Kiss (De kus)
Vincent D'Hondt - Gilles' Wife (La femme de Gilles)

Best Belgian Director
 Frédéric Fonteyne - Gilles' Wife (La femme de Gilles) 
Lieven Debrauwer - Sweet Jam (Confituur)
Felix Van Groeningen - Steve + Sky

Best Belgian Film
 Steve + Sky
Aaltra
Gilles' Wife (La femme de Gilles)

Best Belgian Screenplay
 Gilles' Wife (La femme de Gilles) - Philippe Blasband, Frédéric Fonteyne and Marion Hänsel
When the Sea Rises (Quand la mer monte...) - Yolande Moreau
Steve + Sky - Felix Van Groeningen

Best Belgian Short Film
 Alice and I (Alice et moi)
Cologne
Flatlife

2004 film awards